Guy Trouveroy is a Belgian diplomat and was, from 2014 to July 2017, the ambassador to the United Kingdom, replacing Johan Verbeke.

Trouveroy was previously the Ambassador of Belgium to Russia, presenting his credentials to Russian President Dmitry Medvedev on 12 October 2009.

References

Living people
Ambassadors of Belgium to Russia
Year of birth missing (living people)
Ambassadors of Belgium to the United Kingdom